The Federal University of Recôncavo da Bahia (UFRB) is a Brazilian university, with its main campus at Cruz das Almas, Bahia.

This university also has a campus at Amargosa, Cachoeira, Santo Antônio de Jesus, Feira de Santana e Santo Amaro .

The university was created by the law 11.151, in 2005. In 2011 was announced a new campus in the city of Feira de Santana, and estimated to be operating at the beginning of 2013.

See also
 Recôncavo da Bahia region in Brazil (Portuguese Wikipedia)

References

External links 

 

Universities and colleges in Bahia
Educational institutions established in 2005
Bahia
2005 establishments in Brazil